Southampton City Council elections are held three out of every four years to elect members of Southampton City Council, the local authority for the city of Southampton in Hampshire, England. Since 1 April 1997 Southampton has been a unitary authority responsible for all local government functions; prior to this it was a non-metropolitan district beneath Hampshire County Council.

Southampton City Council is made up of 48 councillors, with three councillors representing each of 16 wards. One councillor from each ward is elected each May on a four-year cycle, with no elections in the fourth year.

Political control
Since the first election to the council in 1973 following the reforms of the Local Government Act 1972, political control of the council has been held by the following parties:

Non-metropolitan district

Unitary authority

Leadership
The leaders of the council since 1996 have been:

Council elections

Non-metropolitan district elections
1973 Southampton City Council election
1976 Southampton City Council election
1979 Southampton City Council election (New ward boundaries & city boundary changes also took place)
1980 Southampton City Council election
1982 Southampton City Council election
1983 Southampton City Council election
1984 Southampton City Council election
1986 Southampton City Council election
1987 Southampton City Council election
1988 Southampton City Council election
1990 Southampton City Council election
1991 Southampton City Council election
1992 Southampton City Council election
1994 Southampton City Council election
1995 Southampton City Council election

Unitary authority elections
1996 Southampton City Council election
1998 Southampton City Council election
1999 Southampton City Council election
2000 Southampton City Council election
2002 Southampton City Council election (New ward boundaries increased the number of seats by 3)
2003 Southampton City Council election
2004 Southampton City Council election
2006 Southampton City Council election
2007 Southampton City Council election
2008 Southampton City Council election
2010 Southampton City Council election
2012 Southampton City Council election
2014 Southampton City Council election
2015 Southampton City Council election
2016 Southampton City Council election
2018 Southampton City Council election
2019 Southampton City Council election
2021 Southampton City Council election
2022 Southampton City Council election
2023 Southampton City Council election (New ward boundaries will increase the number of seats by 3)

City result maps

By-election results

1990s

2000s

2010s

References

External links
Southampton City Council
By-election results

 
Council elections in Hampshire
Politics of Southampton
Unitary authority elections in England